Western Reserve High School is a public high school in Berlin Center, Ohio, United States. It is the only high school in the Western Reserve Local School District. Athletic teams compete as the Western Reserve Blue Devil in the Ohio High School Athletic Association as a member of the Mahoning Valley Athletic Conference.

Athletics
The following is an alphabetical list of sports offered by the high school.
Baseball
Basketball
Cross country running
Football
Golf
Softball
Swimming
Volleyball

References

High schools in Mahoning County, Ohio
Public high schools in Ohio
Western Reserve, Ohio